Han Dong-Won  (born 6 April 1986) is a South Korean footballer who plays for K League Challenge outfit FC Anyang on loan from Gangwon FC, (formerly FC Seoul and Seongnam Ilhwa Chunma).

On 22 March 2011, Han was loaned from Seongnam Ilhwa Chunma to Daegu FC for a one year. In late February 2012, he joined Suwon Bluewings on a season-long loan deal but rescinded his contract in July 2012.

On 31 July 2012, Han moved on free transfer to Gangwon FC.

Club statistics

References

External links
 
 

1986 births
Living people
Association football forwards
South Korean footballers
FC Seoul players
Seongnam FC players
Montedio Yamagata players
Daegu FC players
Suwon Samsung Bluewings players
Gangwon FC players
FC Anyang players
J1 League players
K League 1 players
K League 2 players
People from Suwon
Sportspeople from Gyeonggi Province